Lion On A Leash is the debut full-length album by Ghanaian/Canadian musician Kae Sun.

Track listing

 How Long
 Too Young, Too Soon
 A Day Goes By
 Jungle Law
 Black Candles
 Freedom Train (by Outspoken)
 Free
 Word Interlude
 Lion On A Leash
 Going The Distance
 Blow At The Stars ft. Vanderpark
 On The Lookout

Kae Sun albums
2009 albums